John Donovan Strong (1905-1992) was an American physicist and astronomer. Strong, one of the world's foremost optical scientists, was known for being the first to detect water vapor in the atmosphere of Venus and for developing a number of innovations in optical devices, ranging from improved telescope mirrors to anti-reflective coatings for optical elements and diffraction gratings.

Career 

Born in Lawrence, Kansas in 1905, Strong received degrees from the University of Kansas (BA 1926) and the University of Michigan (M.S., 1928, Ph.D., 1930). After twelve years at Caltech and wartime research at Harvard on infrared systems, Strong became professor and director of the Astrophysics and Physical Meteorology Laboratories at Johns Hopkins University in 1946, where, among many other projects, he conducted research on balloon astronomy for the Office of Naval Research (ONR).

Research 

Strong published hundreds of papers throughout his career and was author of Procedures in Experimental Physics, a standard physics textbook for many years. Strong served as president of the American Optical Association in 1959 and patented numerous inventions for optics in spectroscopy as well as golf (see US Patent no. 3720467). Strong died in 1992.

References

External links
 Full article at UMass at Amherst webpage
 Articles Published by early OSA Presidents Journal of the Optical Society of America
 American Institute of Physics oral history of John Strong

See also
Optical Society of America#Past Presidents of the OSA
1956-Frederic Ives Medal

Fellows of Optica (society)
Presidents of Optica (society)
20th-century American physicists
Optical physicists
1905 births
1992 deaths
University of Michigan alumni